Susan Haydn Thomas (18 March 1947 – 8 August 2015), better known as Susan Sheridan, was an English voice actress. Her roles included Noddy in Noddy's Toyland Adventures, Princess Sylvia in Muzzy in Gondoland, Trillian in the BBC radio series The Hitchhiker's Guide to the Galaxy and Princess Eilonwy in the animated film The Black Cauldron.

Early and personal life
Sheridan trained at the Guildhall School of Music and Drama. Sheridan married the musician Max Brittain and had three daughters. She died from breast cancer on 8 August 2015, aged 68.

Voice roles
Sheridan's voice roles include;
Alex Builds His Farm - Alex
Fire Tripper (English version) – Shu
Moomin (English dub) – Moomin
Noddy's Toyland Adventures – Noddy, Tessie Bear and other character voices
Budgie the Little Helicopter – Sonia (ep. Down on the Farm),  Additional characters
The Little Polar Bear
Round the Bend
The Goose Girl
The Family-Ness
Jimbo and the Jet-Set
Albert the Fifth Musketeer – Milady
Muzzy – Princess Sylvia
Preston Pig – Pumpkin and other character voices
The Animal Shelf – Timothy, Little Mutt, Getup the Giraffe
The Beano Video – Dennis the Menace, Walter's Mum / Pink Glove, Minnie the Minx, Boys, Minnie's Fans, Danny, 'Erbert, Fatty, Toots, Wilfrid, Olive, Cheap-o Airways Lady, Ma
The Beano Videostars – Dennis' Mum, Walter's Mum, Cynthia, Newsreader, Mrs Ramsbottom, Baby #1, Mrs Blenkinsop, Danny, Sidney, Smiffy, Toots, Olive, Toots’ Mum, Baby #2, Ma, Pedestrian #4, Ivy's Mum, Poolgoer #2
Father Christmas and the Missing Reindeer – Simon Watson, Wanda
The Lampies – Livewire, Contact
Bye Bye, Lady Liberty – Michael

Theatre
She was active in theatre with roles in touring companies. 
The Merry Wife of Wilton (1988) 
Howl's Moving Castle (2011) (adaptation)

Radio and television roles
Agony (1980)
Midsomer Murders (2011)
Sheila Hodgon's Here Am I Where Are You? – A boy (1977)
The Hitchhiker's Guide to the Galaxy – Trillian

Filmography

References

External links
 
 Susan Sheridan's website (Archived 3 January 2014)

1947 births
2015 deaths
20th-century English actresses
21st-century English actresses
Alumni of the Guildhall School of Music and Drama
Deaths from breast cancer
Deaths from cancer in England
English radio actresses
English stage actresses
Audiobook narrators
English television actresses
English video game actresses
English voice actresses